The 1996 Toray Pan Pacific Open was a women's tennis tournament played on indoor carpet courts at the Tokyo Metropolitan Gymnasium in Tokyo in Japan that was part of Tier I of the 1996 WTA Tour. It was the 21st edition of the tournament and was held from January 29 through February 4, 1996. Eighth-seeded Iva Majoli won the singles title.

Finals

Singles

 Iva Majoli defeated  Arantxa Sánchez Vicario 6–4, 6–1
 It was Majoli's 1st title of the year and the 3rd of her career.

Doubles

 Gigi Fernández /  Natasha Zvereva defeated  Mariaan de Swardt /  Irina Spîrlea 7–6, 6–3
 It was Fernández's 1st title of the year and the 64th of her career. It was Zvereva's 1st title of the year and the 61st of her career.

References

External links
 ITF tournament edition details
 Tournament draws

Toray Pan Pacific Open
Pan Pacific Open
Toray Pan Pacific Open
Toray Pan Pacific Open
Toray Pan Pacific Open
Pan
1996 Toray Pan Pacific Open